Somatidia costifer is a species of beetle in the family Cerambycidae. It was described by Broun in 1893. It is known from New Zealand.

References

costifer
Beetles described in 1893